The Lockheed Model 10 Electra is an American twin-engined, all-metal monoplane airliner developed by the Lockheed Aircraft Corporation in the 1930s to compete with the Boeing 247 and Douglas DC-2. The type gained considerable fame as one was flown by Amelia Earhart on her ill-fated around-the-world expedition in 1937.

Design and development

Some of Lockheed's wooden designs, such as the Orion, had been built by Detroit Aircraft Corporation with metal fuselages. However, the Electra was Lockheed's first all-metal and twin-engined design by Lloyd Stearman and Hall Hibbard. The name Electra came from a star in the Pleiades. The prototype made its first flight on February 23, 1934, with Marshall Headle at the controls.

Wind-tunnel work on the Electra was undertaken at the University of Michigan. Much of the work was performed by a student assistant, Clarence Johnson. He suggested two changes be made to the design: changing the single tail to double tails (later a Lockheed trademark), and deleting oversized wing fillets. Both of these suggestions were incorporated into production aircraft. Upon receiving his master's degree, Johnson joined Lockheed as a regular employee, ultimately leading the Skunk Works in developing advanced aircraft such as the Lockheed SR-71 Blackbird.

The Lockheed Electra was one of the first commercial passenger aircraft with retractable landing gear to come equipped with mudguards as standard equipment, although aircraft with fixed landing gear commonly had mudguards much earlier than this.

Operational history

After October 1934, when the US government banned single-engined aircraft for use in carrying passengers or in night flying, Lockheed was perfectly placed in the market with its new Model 10 Electra. In addition to deliveries to US-based airlines, several European operators added Electras to their prewar fleets. In Latin America, the first airline to use Electras was Cubana de Aviación, starting in 1935, for its domestic routes.

Besides airline orders, a number of non-commercial civil operators also purchased the new Model 10. In May 1937, H. T. "Dick" Merrill and J. S. Lambie accomplished a round-trip crossing of the Atlantic Ocean. The feat was declared the first round-trip commercial crossing of that ocean by any aircraft. It won them the Harmon Trophy. On the eastbound trip, they carried newsreels of the crash of the Hindenburg, and on the return trip from the United Kingdom, they brought photographs of the coronation of King George VI. Bata Shoes operated the Model 10 to ferry its executives between their European factories.

Probably the most famous use of the Electra was the highly modified Model 10E flown by Amelia Earhart. In July 1937, she disappeared in her Electra during an attempted round-the-world flight.

Many Electras and their design descendants (the Model 12 Electra Junior and Model 14 Super Electra) were pressed into military service during World War II, for instance the USAAF's C-36. By the end of the war, the Electra design was obsolete, although many smaller airlines and charter services continued to operate Electras into the 1970s.

Electras were popular as private planes for royalty in Asia and Europe. In India, the Maharaja of Jammu and Kashmir and the Maharaja of Jodhpur both purchased them for their personal use in 1937.

Variants

The Electra was produced in several variants, for both civilian and military customers. Lockheed built a total of 149 Electras.

Electra 10-A
Powered by two Pratt & Whitney R-985 Wasp Junior SB, 450 hp (336 kW) each; 101 produced.
 Three built for the U.S. Army Air Corps as Y1C-36, redesignated as C-36 in 1938 and as UC-36 in 1943.
 Fifteen impressed by the U.S. Army Air Forces as C-36A, redesignated as UC-36A in 1943.
 One built as XR2O-1 for the U.S. Secretary of the Navy.
 One built as Y1C-37 for the Chief of the National Guard Bureau, redesignated as C-37 in 1938 and as UC-37 in 1943.
Electra 10-B
Powered by Wright R-975-E3 Whirlwind, 440 hp (340 kW) each; 18 produced
 Seven impressed by the U.S. Army Air Forces as C-36C, redesignated as UC-36C in 1943.
 One built as XR3O-1 for the U.S. Coast Guard for use by the Secretary of the Treasury.
Electra 10-C
Powered by Pratt & Whitney R-1340 Wasp SC1, 450 hp (336 kW) each; eight produced for Pan American Airways.
Electra 10-D
Proposed military transport version; none built.
Electra 10-E
Powered by Pratt & Whitney R-1340 Wasp S3H1, 600 hp (450 kW) each; 15 produced. The version used by Amelia Earhart.
 Five impressed by the U.S. Army Air Forces as C-36B, redesignated as UC-36B in 1943.
XC-35
Experimental pressurized research model powered by turbocharged Pratt & Whitney XR-1340-43, 550 hp (410 kW) each. The one production model was tested for the War Department by Lieutenant Benjamin S. Kelsey. For this work, the Army Air Corps was awarded the 1937 Collier Trophy.
Lockheed KXL1
A single Lockheed Model 10 Electra supplied to the Imperial Japanese Navy Air Service for evaluation.

Operators

Civil operators

 Ansett Airways
 Guinea Airways, an Australian airline serving New Guinea.
 MacRobertson-Miller Aviation
 Marshall Airways
 Qantas Empire Airways

 Aeronorte
 Cruzeiro do Sul
 Panair do Brasil
 VARIG

 Canadian Airways
 Trans-Canada Air Lines

 LAN Chile

 Compañia Cubana de Aviación

 Bata Shoes Corporation

 Compañía Mexicana de Aviación

 KLM West Indies Section

 Union Airways of New Zealand
 National Airways Corporation
 Trans-Island Airways

 TASA-Turismo Aereo S.A. operated one aircraft between Panama City (Paitilla) and Chitre circa 1957–1963.

 LOT Polish Airlines operated ten aircraft between 1936 and 1939.

 LARES

 British Airways Ltd. (not to be confused with the present-day British Airways)

 Braniff Airways
 Chicago and Southern Air Lines
 Continental Air Lines
 Delta Air Lines
 Eastern Air Lines
 Mid-Continent Airlines (formerly Hanford Airlines)
 Midwest Airways
 National Airlines
 Northeast Airlines (formerly Boston-Maine/Central Vermont Airways)
 Northwest Airlines
 Pacific Alaska Airways, which became the Alaska division of Pan American Airways
 Provincetown-Boston Airlines
 Wisconsin Central Airlines

 Aerotecnica S.A. ATSA
 Línea Aeropostal Venezolana

 Aeroput

Military operators

 Argentine Air Force

 Brazilian Air Force

 Royal Canadian Air Force

 Honduran Air Force

 Nicaragua Air Force pre 1979

 Spanish Republican Air Force

 Imperial Japanese Navy Air Service

 Royal Air Force

 United States Army Air Corps/Army Air Forces
 United States Navy
 United States Coast Guard

 Venezuelan Air Force

Surviving aircraft

 1011 – Electra 10A on static display at the Pima Air and Space Museum in Tucson, Arizona.
 1015 – Electra 10E on static display at the Museum of Flight in Seattle, Washington.
 1026 – Electra 10A on display at the Oakland Aviation Museum in Oakland, California.
 1037 – Electra 10A on static display at the Science Museum in London.
 1042 Muriel – Electra 10E on static display with the Amelia Earhart Foundation in Atchison, Kansas. Delivered to Atchison in August 2016, it was previously owned by Grace McGuire who had planned on using it to recreate Amelia Earhart's around-the-world flight.
 1052 – Electra 10A on static display at the New England Air Museum in Windsor Locks, Connecticut. Originally an XR2O-1 used for transporting high ranking staff by the U.S. Navy, it is now painted in Northwest Airlines colors. At one point it was intended to use this machine for a recreation of the Earhart flight but it was not carried out.
 1091 – Electra 10A airworthy with Ivo Lukačovič at Točná Airport in Točná, Prague. Registered previously as OK-CTB (now N241M), it was one of two owned by Bata Shoe Co. in Prague, Czechoslovakia before WWII. At the outbreak of WWII it was evacuated to England, and onward to Canada where it served with the RCAF. After a succession of US owners, it was eventually reacquired by Bata Shoe, and fully restored by Wichita Air Services in Newton, Kansas. Wearing its original colors and registration marks, it was ferried back to Prague in May 2015.
 1112 – Electra 10A on static display at the Canada Aviation and Space Museum in Ottawa, Ontario. Originally purchased by Trans-Canada Air Lines as their first new aircraft, it was transferred to the RCAF in 1939, with whom it served for most of World War II. After the war it was operated by a number of private owners. It survived into the 1960s when Ann Pellegreno between June 7 and July 10, 1967, flew the aircraft on a round-the-world flight to commemorate Amelia Earhart's last flight in 1937. After being acquired by Air Canada, it was restored in 1968 and donated to the museum.
 1116 – Electra 10A airworthy at the Royal Aviation Museum of Western Canada in Winnipeg, Manitoba. It was one of a second batch of three Electras delivered to Trans-Canada Airlines. Found in Florida in the early 1980s by a vacationing Air Canada employee, it was returned to Winnipeg for restoration. In 1987 it flew across Canada in honor of the 50th anniversary of Air Canada – who owns and operates the aircraft.
 1130 – Electra 10A on static display at the National Naval Aviation Museum in Pensacola, Florida.
 1138 – Electra 10A on static display at the Museum of Transport and Technology in Auckland.
 1141 - Electra 10A in final stages of 24 year ground-up restoration at Auckland, New Zealand. Aircraft ex MATI Museum, Alaska.
 3105 – XC-35 in storage at the Paul E. Garber Preservation, Restoration, and Storage Facility of the National Air and Space Museum in Suitland, Maryland. It was used for testing pressurization.

Specifications (Electra 10A)

See also

References

Notes

Bibliography
 Bridgman, Leonard. Jane's All the World's Aircraft 1948. London: Sampson Low, Marston & Company, Ltd., 1948.
 Francillon, René J. Lockheed Aircraft since 1913. London: Putnam, 1982. .
 Francillon, René J. Lockheed Aircraft since 1913. Annapolis, Maryland, USA: Naval Institute Press, 1987. .
 Garrison, Peter. "Head Skunk". Air & Space Magazine, March 2010.
 Gerdessen, Frederik. "Estonian Air Power 1918 – 1945". Air Enthusiast, No. 18, April – July 1982. pp. 61–76. .
 Gunston, Bill. Lockheed Aircraft: The History of Lockheed Martin (Aircraft Cutaways). Oxford, UK: Osprey, 1998. .
 Justo, Craig P. "Ten out of Ten: The Life and Times of a Lockheed Electra". Air Enthusiast, No. 94, July–August 2001, pp. 10–917. 
 Winchester, Jim, ed. "Lockheed 10 Electra". Civil Aircraft (The Aviation Factfile). London: Grange Books plc, 2004. .

External links

 XC-35 in the collection of the National Air and Space Museum
 XC-35 from National Museum of the United States Air Force
 "Luxurious Air Yacht Is a Home with Wings" Popular Mechanics, January 1936 Electra converted for business travel.
 Lockheed Electra 10A Restoration project, New Zealand

Electra
1930s United States airliners
1930s United States military transport aircraft
Amelia Earhart
Low-wing aircraft
World War II transport aircraft of the United States
Aircraft first flown in 1934
Twin piston-engined tractor aircraft
Twin-tail aircraft